Field Marshal Plaek Phibunsongkhram (alternatively transcribed as Pibulsongkram or Pibulsonggram; 14 July 1897 – 11 June 1964), locally known as Marshal P., contemporarily known as Phibun (Pibul) in the West, was a Thai military officer and politician who served as the Prime Minister of Thailand from 1938 to 1944 and 1948 to 1957.

Phibunsongkhram was a member of the Royal Siamese Army wing of Khana Ratsadon, the first political party in Thailand, and a leader of the Siamese revolution of 1932, transforming Thailand from an absolute monarchy to a constitutional monarchy. Phibun became the third Prime Minister of Thailand in 1938 as Commander of the Royal Siamese Army, established a de facto military dictatorship inspired by the Italian fascist Benito Mussolini, promoted Thai nationalism and sinophobia, and allied Thailand with Imperial Japan in World War II. Phibun launched a modernization campaign known as the Thai Cultural Revolution that included a series of cultural mandates, changing the country's name from "Siam" to "Thailand", and promoting the common Thai language.

Phibun was ousted as prime minister by the National Assembly in 1944 and replaced by members of the Free Thai Movement, until returning to power in the Siamese coup d'état of 1947, led by the Coup Group. Phibun aligned Thailand with anti-communism in the Cold War, entered the Korean War under the United Nations Command, and abandoned fascism for a façade of democracy. Phibun's second term as prime minister was plagued by political instability and was subject to several attempted coup d'etats to remove him, including the Army General Staff plot in 1948, the Palace Rebellion in 1949, and the Manhattan Rebellion in 1951. Phibun attempted to transform Thailand into an electoral democracy from the mid-1950s but was overthrown in 1957 and entered exile in Japan, where he died in 1964.

Phibun is the longest-serving Prime Minister of Thailand to date, at fifteen years and one month.

Early years 

Plaek Khittasangkha was born on 14 July 1897 in Mueang Nonthaburi, Nonthaburi Province in the Kingdom of Siam to Keed Khittasangkha and his wife. Plaek's paternal grandfather was said to be a Cantonese-speaking Chinese immigrant. However, the family was completely assimilated as Central Thai people and Plaek does not pass the criteria for being Chinese (albeit Cantonese in Thailand didn't supremacy like Teochews and Hoklos), which is why he could later successfully conceal and deny his Chinese roots. Plaek's parents owned a durian orchard and he received his given name – meaning 'strange' in English – because of his unusual appearance as a child. Plaek Khittasangkha studied at Buddhist temple schools, then was appointed to Chulachomklao Royal Military Academy. He graduated in 1914 and was commissioned a second lieutenant in the artillery. Following World War I, he was sent to study artillery tactics in France. In 1928, as he rose in rank, he received the noble title Luang from King Prajadhipok and became known as Luang Phibunsongkhram. He would later drop his Luang title, but permanently adopted Phibunsongkhram as his surname.

1932 revolution 

In 1932, Phibun was one of the leaders of the Royal Siamese Army branch of the Khana Ratsadon (People's Party), a political organization that staged a coup d'état which overthrew the absolute monarchy in Siam and replaced it with a constitutional monarchy. Phibun, at the time a lieutenant colonel, quickly rose to prominence in the military as a "man-on-horseback". The 1932 coup was followed by the nationalization of some companies and increasing state control of the economy.

The following year, Phibun and allied military officers successfully crushed the Boworadet Rebellion, a royalist revolt led by Prince Boworadet The new king was still a child studying in Switzerland, and parliament appointed Colonel Prince Anuwatjaturong, Lieutenant Commander Prince Aditya Dibabha, and Chao Phraya Yommaraj (Pun Sukhum) as his regents.

Prime Minister of Thailand

First premiership
On 16 December 1938, Phibun replaced Phraya Phahol as the Prime Minister of Thailand and as the Commander of the Royal Siamese Army. Phibun became the de facto dictator of Thailand and established a military dictatorship, consolidating his position by rewarding several members of his own army clique with influential positions in his government.

After the revolution of 1932, the Thai government of Phraya Phahol was impressed by the success of the March on Rome of Benito Mussolini's Italian Fascism movement. Phibun also seemed to be an admirer of the Italian fascism and sought to imitate the fascist Italian regime's cinema propaganda, valued as one of the most powerful propaganda instruments of Italian political power. Its main purpose was to promote the ideologies of nationalism and militarism, strengthening the unity and harmony of the state, and glorifying the policy of ruralisation in Italy and abroad. With the pro-fascist leanings of Thai political leaders, Italian propaganda films including newsreels, documentaries, short films, and full-length feature films, such as Istituto Luce Cinecittà, were shown in Thailand during the interwar period. Phibun adopted the Italian-style fascist salute, modeled on the Roman salute, and he used it during speeches. The salute was not compulsory in Thailand, and it was opposed by Luang Wichitwathakan and many cabinet members as they believed it inappropriate for Thai culture. Together with Wichitwathakan, the Minister of Propaganda, he built a leadership cult in 1938 and thereafter. Photographs of Phibun were to be found everywhere, and those of the abdicated King Prajadhipok were banned. His quotes appeared in newspapers, were plastered on billboards, and were repeated over the radio.

Thai Cultural Revolution 

Phibun immediately prioritised Thai nationalism to the point of ultranationalism and to support this policy, he launched a series of major reforms, known as the "Thai Cultural Revolution" to increase the pace of modernisation in Thailand. His goal "Aimed to uplift the national spirit and moral code of the nation and instilling progressive tendencies and a newness into Thai life". A series of cultural mandates were issued by the government. These mandates encouraged all Thais to salute the flag in public places, know the new national anthem and use the standardised Thai language, not regional dialects or languages. People were encouraged to adopt Western attire as opposed to traditional clothing styles. Similarly, people were encouraged to eat with Western-style utensils, such as forks and spoons, rather than with their hands as was customary in Thai culture at the time. Phibun saw these policies as necessary, in the interest of progressivism, to change Thailand in the minds of foreigners from an undeveloped country into a civilized and modern one.

Phibun's administration encouraged economic nationalism and espoused staunchly anti-Teochew sentiment. Sinophobic policies were imposed by the government to reduce the economic power of Siam's Teochew-Hoklo origin and encouraged the Central Thai people to purchase as many Thai products as possible. In a speech in 1938, Luang Wichitwathakan, himself of one-quarter Chinese ancestry, followed Rama VI's book Jews of the East in comparing the Teochew in Siam to the Jews in Germany, who at the time were harshly repressed.

On 24 June 1939, Phibun changed the country's official English name from "Siam" to "Thailand" at Wichitwathakan's urging. The name "Siam" was an exonym of unknown and probably foreign origin, which conflicted with Phibun's nationalist policies.

In 1941, in the midst of World War II, Phibun decreed 1 January as the official start of the new year instead of the traditional Songkran date on 13 April.

Franco-Thai War

Phibun exploited the Fall of France in June 1940 and the Japanese invasion of French Indochina in September 1940 to advance Thai interests in French Indochina following a border dispute with France. Phibun believed Thailand could recover territories ceded to France by King Rama V because the French would avoid armed confrontation or offer serious resistance. Thailand fought against Vichy France over the disputed areas from October 1940 to May 1941. The technologically and numerically superior Thai force invaded French Indochina and attacked military targets in major cities. Despite Thai successes, the French tactical victory at the Battle of Ko Chang prompted intervention from the Japanese, who mediated an armistice where the French were forced to cede the disputed territories to Thailand.

Alliance with Japan 

Phibun and the Thai public viewed the outcome of the Franco-Thai War as a victory, but it resulted in the rapidly expanding Japanese gaining the right to occupy French Indochina. Although Phibun was ardently pro-Japanese, he now shared a border with them and felt threatened with a potential Japanese invasion. Phibun's administration also realised that Thailand would have to fend for itself if a Japanese invasion came, considering its deteriorating relationships with Western powers in the area.

When the Japanese invaded Thailand on 8 December 1941, (because of the international date line this occurred an hour and a half before the attack on Pearl Harbor), Phibun was reluctantly forced to order a general ceasefire after just one day of resistance and allow the Japanese armies to use the country as a base for their invasions of the British colonies of Burma and Malaya.<ref>Churchill, Winston S. The Second World War, Vol 3, The Grand Alliance, p.548 Cassell & Co. Ltd, 1950</em></ref> Hesitancy, however, gave way to enthusiasm after the Japanese rolled through the Malayan Campaign in a "Bicycle Blitzkrieg" with surprisingly little resistance. On 21 December Phibun signed a military alliance with Japan. The following month, on 25 January 1942, Phibun declared war on Britain and the United States. South Africa and New Zealand declared war on Thailand on the same day. Australia followed soon after. Phibun purged all who opposed the Japanese alliance from his government. Pridi Banomyong was appointed acting regent for the absent King Ananda Mahidol, while Direk Jayanama, the prominent foreign minister who had advocated continued resistance against the Japanese, was later sent to Tokyo as an ambassador. The United States considered Thailand to be a puppet state of Japan and refused to declare war on it. When the Allies were victorious, the United States blocked British efforts to impose a punitive peace.

Removal
In 1944, as the Japanese neared defeat and the underground anti-Japanese Free Thai Movement steadily grew in strength, the National Assembly ousted Phibun as prime minister and his six-year reign as the military commander-in-chief came to an end. Phibun's resignation was partly forced by two grandiose plans: one was to relocate the capital from Bangkok to a remote site in the jungle near Phetchabun in north central Thailand, and another was to build a "Buddhist city" in Saraburi. Announced at a time of severe economic difficulty, these ideas turned many government officers against him. After his resignation, Phibun went to stay at the army headquarters in Lopburi.

Khuang Aphaiwong replaced Phibun as prime minister, ostensibly to continue relations with the Japanese, but, in reality, to secretly assist the Free Thai Movement. At the war's end, Phibun was put on trial at Allied insistence on charges of having committed war crimes, mainly that of collaborating with the Axis powers. However, he was acquitted amid intense pressure as public opinion was still favourable to him, as he was thought to have done his best to protect Thai interests. Phibun's alliance with Japan had Thailand take advantage of Japanese support to expand Thai territory into Malaya and Burma.<ref>Aldrich, Richard J. The Key to the South:  Britain, the United States, and Thailand during the Approach of the Pacific War, 1929-1942. Oxford University Press, 1993. </em></ref>

Second premiership

In November 1947, Royal Thai Army units under the control of Phibun known as the Coup Group carried out the Siamese coup d'état of 1947 which forced then-Prime Minister Thawan Thamrongnawasawat to resign. The rebels installed Khuang Aphaiwong again as prime minister as the military coup risked international disapproval. Pridi Phanomyong was persecuted but was aided by British and US intelligence officers, and thus managed to escape the country. On 8 April 1948, Phibun assumed the position of Prime Minister after the military forced Khuang out of office.

Phibun's second premiership was notably different, abandoning the fascist styling and rhetoric that characterised his first premiership, and instead promoted a façade of democracy. The beginning of the Cold War saw Phibun align Thailand with the anti-communist camp, and received large quantities of US aid following Thailand's entry into the Korean War as part of the United Nations Command's multi-national allied force against the communist forces of North Korea and the People's Republic of China. Phibun's anti-Chinese campaign was resumed, with the government restricting Chinese immigration and undertaking various measures to restrict economic domination of the Thai market by those of Chinese descent. Chinese schools and associations were once again shut down. Despite open pro-Western and anti-Chinese policies, in the late-1950s Phibun arranged to send two of the children of Sang Phathanothai, his closest advisor, to China with the intention of establishing a backdoor channel for dialogue between China and Thailand. Sirin Phathanothai, aged eight, and her brother, aged twelve, were sent to be brought up under the assistants of Premier Zhou Enlai as his wards. Sirin later wrote The Dragon's Pearl, an autobiography telling her experiences growing up in the 1950s and 1960s among the leaders of China.

Phibun was reportedly thrilled by the democracy and freedom of speech he had witnessed during a long trip abroad to the United States and Europe in 1955. Following the example of Hyde Park in London, he set up a "Speakers' Corner" at the Sanam Luang in Bangkok. Phibun began to democratize Thailand by allowing the formation of new political parties, amnestied political opponents, and planned free elections. Phibun founded and became chairman of his own new political party, the Seri Manangkhasila Party, which was dominated by the most influential in the military and the government. The Employment Act of January 1957 legalized trade unions, limited weekly working hours, regulated holidays and overtime, and instituted health and safety regulations. The International Workers' Day became a public holiday.

Power play

Phibun's second premiership was longer but plagued with political instability, and there were numerous attempts to oppose his rule and remove him from power. Unlike his first premiership, Phibun faced noticeable opposition from people connected to the Free Thai Movement due to his alliance with the Japanese, including from within the military. Additionally, Phibun was indebted to the powerful Coup Group that had returned him to power.

On 1 October 1948, the unsuccessful Army General Staff Plot was launched by members of the army general staff to topple his government, but failed when discovered by the Coup Group. As a result, more than fifty army and reserve officers and several prominent supporters of Pridi Phanomyong were arrested.

On 26 February 1949, the Palace Rebellion was another failed coup attempt against Phibun to restore Pridi Phanomyong by occupying the Grand Palace in Bangkok and declaring a new government led by Direk Jayanama, a close associate of Pridi. The civilian rebels were quickly ousted from the palace, but fighting broke out between military rebels and loyalists which lasted for over a week.

On 29 June 1951, Phibun was attending a ceremony aboard the Manhattan, a US dredge boat, when he was taken hostage by a group of Royal Thai Navy officers, who then quickly confined him aboard the warship Sri Ayutthaya. Negotiations between the government and the coup organizers swiftly broke down, leading to violent street fighting in Bangkok between the navy and the army, which was supported by the Royal Thai Air Force. Phibun was able to escape and swim back to shore when the Sri Ayutthaya was bombed by the air force, and with their hostage gone, the navy were forced to lay down their arms.

On 29 November 1951, the Silent Coup was staged by the Coup Group and it consolidated the military's hold on the country. It reinstated the Constitution of 1932, which effectively eliminated the Senate, established a unicameral legislature composed equally of elected and government-appointed members, and allowed serving military officers to supplement their commands with important ministerial portfolios.

In 1956, it became clearer that Plaek, allied to Phao, was losing to another influential group led by Sarit which consisted of "Sakdina" (royalties and royalists). Both Plaek and Phao intended to bring home Pridi Banomyong to clear his name from mystery around death of King Rama VIII. However, the US government disapproved, and they canceled the plan.

1957 coup and exile

In February 1957, public opinion turned against Phibun at the end of his second term when his party was suspected of fraudulent practices during an election, including the intimidation of the opposition, buying votes, and electoral fraud. In addition, critics of Phibun accused him of a lack of respect for the Thai monarchy, as the anti-aristocratic prime minister had always sought to limit the role of the monarchy to a constitutional minimum and had taken on religious functions that traditionally belonged to the monarch. For example, Phibun led the celebrations of the 2500th anniversary of Buddhism in 1956/57 instead of the King Bhumibol Adulyadej, who was openly critical of Phibun. On 16 September 1957, Phibun was eventually overthrown in a coup d'etat by members of the Royal Thai Army under the command of Field Marshal Sarit Thanarat, who had earlier sworn to be Phibun's most loyal subordinate. Sarit was supported by many royalists who wanted to regain a foothold, and there were rumors that the United States was "deeply involved" in the coup.

Phibun was then forced into exile after the coup, first fleeing to Cambodia, but later settled in Japan after Sarit's new regime rejected his requests to allow him to return to Thailand. In 1960, Phibun briefly travelled to India to be a monk in the Buddhist temple in Bodhgaya.

Death
Phibun died on 11 June 1964 from heart failure while in exile in Sagamihara, Kanagawa Prefecture, Japan. After his death, Phibun's ashes were transferred to Thailand in an urn and decorated with military honors in Wat Phra Sri Mahathat (also called "The Temple of Democracy") he had founded in Bang Khen.

Honours

Noble titles
 7 May 1928: Luang Phibunsongkhram (หลวงพิบูลสงคราม)
 15 May 1942: Abolition of nobility

Military rank
 1916 – Second lieutenant
 1920 – Lieutenant
 1927 – Captain
 1930 – Major
 1933 – Lieutenant colonel
 1934 – Colonel
 1939 – Major General, Rear Admiral, Air Vice Marshal
 1941 – Field Marshal, Admiral of the Fleet, Marshal of the Royal Thai Air Force
 1955 – Volunteer Defense Corps General

Thai decorations 
Plaek Phibunsongkhram received the following royal decorations in the Honours System of Thailand:

 1941 –  Knight of The Ancient and Auspicious Order of the Nine Gems
 1942 –  The Ratana Varabhorn Order of Merit
 1942 –  Knight Grand Cross (First Class) of The Most Illustrious Order of Chula Chom Klao
 1940 –  Knight Grand Cordon (Special Class) of The Most Exalted Order of the White Elephant
 1937 –  Knight Grand Cordon (Special Class) of The Most Noble Order of the Crown of Thailand
 1944 –  Bravery Medal
 1941 –  Victory Medal - Indochina
 1943 –  Victory Medal - World War II
 1934 –  Safeguarding the Constitution Medal
 1934 –  Dushdi Mala Medal Pin Service to the Nation
 1943 –  Dushdi Mala Medal Pin of Arts and Science
 1943 –  Medal for Service Rendered in the Interior (Asia) 
 1954 –  Border Service Medal
 1930 –  Chakra Mala Medal 
 1938 –  King Rama VIII Royal Cypher Medal, 1st
 1953 –  King Rama IX Royal Cypher Medal, 1st
 1911 –  King Rama VI Coronation Medal
 1925 –  King Rama VII Coronation Medal
 1932 –  Commemorative Medal on the Occasion of the 150th Years of Rattanakosin Celebration

Foreign honours
 :
 1937 –  Order of the German Red Cross
 1939 –  1st Class of the Order of the German Eagle
 :
 1937 –  Knight Grand Cross of the Order of Saints Maurice and Lazarus
 1938 –  Grand Officer of the Order of the Crown of Italy

 :
 1955 –  Grand Cross with White Decoration of the Order of Military Merit
 1954 –  Grand Cross White Decoration of the Cross of Naval Merit
 :
 1942 –  Grand Cordon (1st Class) of the Order of the Rising Sun
 :
 1955 –  Grand Cross of the Order of Sikatuna
 :
 1939 –  Knight Grand Cross of the Order of St Michael and St George
 :
 1955 –  Chief Commander of the Legion of Merit 
 :
 1938 –  Grand-Croix of the Legion of Honour 
 :
 1955 –  Grand Cordon of the Order of Leopold 
 :
 1955 –  Knight Grand Cross of the Order of the Netherlands Lion 
 :
 1955 –  Grand Commander of the Order of the Dannebrog 
 :
 1955 –  Knight Grand Cross of the Order of Merit of the Italian Republic 
 :
 1955 –  Grand Cross of the Order of the Million Elephants and the White Parasol 
 :
 1955 –  Knight Grand Cross of the Royal Order of Cambodia 
 :
 1956 –  Grand Cross of the Order of George I 
 :
 1955 –  Grand Cross 1st Class of the Order of Merit of the Federal Republic of Germany 
 :
 1956 –  Order of the Order of Sirisudharma

Academic rank
 1939 Adjunct Professor of Thammasat University

See also
 History of Thailand (1932–1973)
 Saharat Thai Doem
 Nitya Pibulsonggram
 Ramwong
 Thai cultural mandates
 Suharto
 Francisco Franco
 Antonio Salazar
 Joseph McCarthy

References

Bibliography

External links

 Duncan Stearn:A Slice of Thai History: The Japanese invasion of Thailand, 8 December 1941 Pattaya Mail – Pattaya's First English Language Newspaper (part one) Columns (part two) Columns (part three)
 

1897 births
1964 deaths
Cantonese people
Plaek Phibunsongkhram
Plaek Phibunsongkhram
Plaek Phibunsongkhram
Exiled politicians
Plaek Phibunsongkhram
Grand Crosses 1st class of the Order of Merit of the Federal Republic of Germany
Honorary Knights Grand Cross of the Order of St Michael and St George
Plaek Phibunsongkhram
Plaek Phibunsongkhram
Plaek Phibunsongkhram
Plaek Phibunsongkhram
Leaders ousted by a coup
Plaek Phibunsongkhram
Plaek Phibunsongkhram
Military history of Thailand during World War II
Plaek Phibunsongkhram
Plaek Phibunsongkhram
Plaek Phibunsongkhram
Plaek Phibunsongkhram
Plaek Phibunsongkhram
Plaek Phibunsongkhram
Plaek Phibunsongkhram
Plaek Phibunsongkhram
Plaek Phibunsongkhram
Plaek Phibunsongkhram
Plaek Phibunsongkhram
Plaek Phibunsongkhram
Plaek Phibunsongkhram
Plaek Phibunsongkhram
Plaek Phibunsongkhram
Plaek Phibunsongkhram
Plaek Phibunsongkhram
Plaek Phibunsongkhram
Refugees in Japan
Plaek Phibunsongkhram
Plaek Phibunsongkhram
Plaek Phibunsongkhram
Plaek Phibunsongkhram
Plaek Phibunsongkhram
Plaek Phibunsongkhram
Plaek Phibunsongkhram
Plaek Phibunsongkhram
Plaek Phibunsongkhram
Plaek Phibunsongkhram
Plaek Phibunsongkhram
Plaek Phibunsongkhram
World War II political leaders